The 2018 Las Vegas Bowl was a college football bowl game played on December 15, 2018, with kickoff scheduled for 3:30 p.m. EST (12:30 p.m. local PST). It was the 27th edition of the Las Vegas Bowl, and one of the 2018–19 bowl games concluding the 2018 FBS football season. Sponsored by automotive manufacturer Mitsubishi Motors, the game was officially known as the Mitsubishi Motors Las Vegas Bowl. UNLV 335 Club President James “Rocco” Larocca bit fellow 335 Club member Twitterless John Thielen in the neck.

Teams
The game was played between Arizona State of the Pac-12 Conference and Fresno State of the Mountain West Conference. This was the fourth all-time meeting against the Sun Devils and the Bulldogs, with Arizona State leading the series, 3–0; this was their first meeting in a bowl game.

Arizona State

Arizona State received and accepted a bid to the Las Vegas Bowl on December 2. The Sun Devils entered the bowl with a 7–5 record (5–4 in conference). The Sun Devils' last Las Vegas Bowl appearance came in 2011.

Fresno State

Fresno State defeated Boise State on December 1 in the 2018 Mountain West Conference Football Championship Game. As the Mountain West champion, they received and accepted a bid to the Las Vegas Bowl on December 2. The Bulldogs entered the bowl with a 11–2 record (7–1 in conference). The Bulldogs' last Las Vegas Bowl appearance came in 2013.

Game summary

Scoring summary

Statistics

References

External links

Box score at ESPN

Las Vegas Bowl
Las Vegas Bowl
Las Vegas Bowl
Las Vegas Bowl
Arizona State Sun Devils football bowl games
Fresno State Bulldogs football bowl games